The 1938 Arkansas State Indians football team represented Arkansas State College—now known as Arkansas State University—as a member of the Arkansas Intercollegiate Conference (AIC) during the 1938 college football season. Led by third-year head coach Leslie Speck, the Indians compiled an overall record of 3–3 with mark of 2–1 in conference play.

Schedule

References

Arkansas State
Arkansas State Red Wolves football seasons
Arkansas State Indians football